Banding Island (locally Pulau Banding) is an artificial island within Lake Temenggor, Perak, Malaysia.

Hulu Perak District
Islands of Perak